Sagaricera is a genus of flies in the family Stratiomyidae.

Species
Sagaricera aenescens Grünberg, 1915
Sagaricera analis (Macquart, 1838)

References

Stratiomyidae
Brachycera genera
Taxa named by Karl Grünberg
Diptera of Africa